Vozdukh is a Russian word meaning air, and may refer to:

 Vozdukh, a system within the International Space Station Environmental Control and Life Support System, used to remove carbon dioxide from the spacecraft air
 Vozdukh (magazine), a Russian poetry magazine